Covina station is a Metrolink train station located at 600 North Citrus Avenue in Covina, California. It is located just east of Citrus Avenue between Front Street and Edna Place.

The station is owned by the City of Covina. It is one of the few Metrolink stations that charges for parking (on weekdays only, for parking is free on the weekends).
The small lot near the platforms requires a monthly permit.  The parking structure across Citrus Avenue has lower monthly rates and allows daily parking. There is a discount for Covina residents purchasing monthly parking permits.

Bus connections include Foothill Transit Route 281, which stops on Citrus Avenue, and the City of West Covina's "Go West" shuttle.
The cities of Azusa and Glendora also operate shuttles to the station.

References

External links
 
 Foothill Transit
 Azusa Transportation Metrolink Shuttle

Metrolink stations in Los Angeles County, California
Railway stations in the United States opened in 1992